Lutui is a surname, and may refer to:

Aleki Lutui (born 1978), Tongan rugby player
Hiva Lutui (born 1994), American football player
Taitusi Lutui (born 1983), Tongan-born former American football player (commonly known as "Deuce" Lutui)
Soloni Lutui (born 1968), Tongan architect and inventor.